Daniel Benson (born 14 May 1997), known professionally as Bnxn (pronounced as Benson) and formerly known as Buju, is a Nigerian Afro-fusion singer, songwriter and record producer.

Early life 
He was born in Lagos. He hails from Akwa Ibom state. He was previously signed to Burna Boy's Spaceship Records, He grew up in Gbagada with his family, relocating to Ogun State.

Career 

Bnxn (pronounced as Benson) released the extended play project Sorry I'm Late on 27 October 2021, under the management of T.Y.E/EMPIRE. It featured guest appearances from Nigerian Highlife music duo, The Cavemen, and production from Steph, Perlz, Denzl, Timi Jay and Rexxie. It was mixed and mastered by Vtek and Poppil. Motolani Alake of Pulse Nigeria said that it "projects confidence, wins and 'comfort". Buju performed his first show in London on 30 November, marking the beginning of his Sorry I'm Late tour.

On 22 December 2021, Buju headlined his first sold-out concert, which was also his debut concert in Lagos. held at Balmoral Convection centre, Lagos.

In 2022, Buju officially changed his name to BNXN to avoid confusion for being mistaken with Buju Banton and having more unique branding. In March 2022, he collaborated with Pheelz on the single "Finesse"; the song peaked at number 52 on the UK's Official Singles Chart. In July 2022, he featured on the Jae5 song "Propeller" alongside British rapper Dave. The song became Bnxn's first Top 40 single in the United Kingdom, entering the chart at number 38.

On 4 September 2022, Bnxn won The Headies 2022 Next Rated award which was held on Sunday at the Cobb Energy Performing Arts Centre in Atlanta, Georgia, United States.

Discography

Extended plays
Sorry I'm Late (2021)
Bad Since ’97 (2022)
Kenkele
Fought with Police

Singles

As featured artist

Awards and nominations

References 

1997 births
Nigerian singer-songwriters
21st-century Nigerian singers
Living people